Ze'evi is a surname. Notable people with the surname include:

Ariel Ze'evi (born 1977), Israeli judoka
Dror Ze'evi, Israeli historian
Rehavam Ze'evi (1926–2001), Israeli general, politician, and historian who was assassinated

See also
 Ze'ev